The Algerian Women's Volleyball League is the highest professional women's volleyball league in Algeria. It is run by the Algerian Volleyball Federation. It is considered one of the top national leagues in African volleyball, as its clubs have made significant success in African competitions.

List of women's champions

Titles by team

Members of the Algerian Women's Volleyball League (2021–22 season)
These are the teams that participate in the 2021–22 Algerian Women's Volleyball League season.

Group Center-West

Group Center-East

See also
Algerian Men's Volleyball League

References

External links
 Volleyball in Algeria

Volleyball in Algeria
Algeria
1962 establishments in Algeria
Women's volleyball leagues
Women's sports leagues in Algeria
Volleyball